The Montserrat oriole (Icterus oberi) is a medium-sized black-and-yellow icterid (the same family as many blackbirds, meadowlarks, cowbirds, grackles, and others, including the New World orioles).

It inhabits the Centre Hills and South Soufriere Hills Important Bird Areas on the island of Montserrat in the Lesser Antilles of the West Indies, and is the national bird of this British territory. It is threatened by habitat loss, and until 2016 was classified by BirdLife International as Critically Endangered, with a current estimated population of between 200 and 800. Much of its habitat was destroyed by deforestation, Hurricane Hugo and the volcanic activity between 1995 and 1997.

The oriole once was found in three main areas: the bamboo forest east of Galways Soufrière, the leeward slopes of the Chances Peak mountain and the Centre Hills (especially the Runaway Ghaut area).

The diet of the bird consists mainly of insects and fruits. The birds usually lay two spotted eggs. All models indicate that they begin breeding at the age of one year. Most of them were almost wiped out during the volcano eruptions and only about 200 of them are still surviving.

The binomial name of this bird commemorates the American naturalist Frederick Albion Ober.

Taxonomy
The Montserrat oriole was formally described in 1880 by the American amateur ornithologist George Newbold Lawrence from a specimen collected on the island Montserrat during an expedition to the West Indies led by the US naturalist Frederick Albion Ober. Lawrence introduced the current binomial name Icterus oberi, with the specific epithet chosen to honour Ober. The genus Icterus was introduced by the French zoologist Mathurin Jacques Brisson in 1760. The species is monotypic: no subspecies are recognised.

References

External links

BirdLife Species Factsheet.

Montserrat Oriole
Montserrat Oriole
Birds of Montserrat
Endemic fauna of Montserrat
Birds described in 1880